Kevin Cooper (born Richard Goodman; January 8, 1958) is an African-American man currently on death row at San Quentin Prison. Cooper was found guilty of four murders in the Chino Hills area of California in 1983. However, he has steadfastly maintained his innocence.

Cooper's conviction and death sentence has been highly controversial, garnering repeated attention from both Nicholas Kristof in the New York Times and Erin Moriarty on the CBS News program "48 Hours." There have been accusations that Cooper received an inadequate defense, as well as prosecutorial misconduct such as destruction of evidence, withholding exculpatory evidence from the defense, planting of evidence, brainwashing to witnesses, and perjured testimony by the Sheriff's Department. There have also been practical questions raised, such as how Cooper, at 155 pounds, and allegedly acting alone, overpowered a 6-foot, 2-inch ex-military policeman and his athletic wife, both of whom had loaded firearms close at hand.  It has also been questioned why a single perpetrator would use 3 or 4 different weapons to commit the murders, and why none of the victims were able to run away while the others were being attacked.

Cooper's habeas corpus petitions have been denied. The evidence in the case of the original trial has been reviewed by the California Supreme Court, by the United States District Court and by the Ninth Circuit Court of Appeals.

In 2007, two judges of the United States Court of Appeals for the Ninth Circuit wrote that "As the district court and all state courts, have repeatedly found, evidence of Cooper's guilt was overwhelming. The tests for which he asked to show his innocence 'once and for all' show nothing of the sort." In a concurring opinion, however, Judge Margaret McKeown said she was troubled that the court could not resolve the question of Cooper's guilt "once and for all" and noted that significant evidence bearing on Cooper's culpability has been lost, destroyed or left unpursued. In a lecture, a distinguished federal appeals court judge, William A. Fletcher, declared "the San Bernardino Sheriff's Department framed him".

In a dissenting opinion, written in 2009, Judge Fletcher began by stating: "The State of California may be about to execute an innocent man." Fletcher wrote that the police may have tampered with the evidence and that the Ninth Circuit Court should have reheard the case en banc and should have "ordered the district judge to give Cooper the fair hearing he has never had." Five federal circuit court judges joined in Fletcher's dissent and five more stated that Cooper has never had a fair hearing to determine his innocence.

Early life 

Kevin Cooper was born Richard Goodman on January 8, 1958, near Pittsburgh, Pennsylvania.  When he was two months old, his mother placed him in an orphanage.  At the age of six months, he was adopted by Melvin and Esther Cooper, who renamed him Kevin Cooper. As a child, Kevin Cooper was subject to physical abuse and ran away from home numerous times. As an adolescent, he was sent to juvenile custody numerous times.

Previous criminal record 

Cooper had a criminal past that included stealing and burglary. He was sentenced to a one-to-two-year prison term in 1977 for burglarizing a home in Pittsburgh, Pennsylvania. Cooper was never tried but later stipulated to kidnapping and raping a minor female who interrupted him during a burglary in Pennsylvania." Cooper agreed to the stipulation on the advice of his lawyer who mistakenly believed this admission would help Cooper avoid the death penalty in the Chino Hills case. " During the purported crime, he threatened to kill the teen-age victim. Over the next five years, he was convicted and sentenced to jail twice for burglaries and was released on probation in 1982. He escaped from custodial settings in Pennsylvania 11 times. In late 1982, Cooper fled to California after escaping from a Pennsylvania psychiatric facility. In California, Cooper was soon convicted of two burglaries in the Los Angeles area. He began serving a four-year sentence under the alias David Trautman at the California Institution for Men (CIM) in Chino on April 29, 1983, where he was assigned to the minimum security section. On June 2, 1983, Cooper climbed through a hole in the prison fence and walked away from the prison across an open field.

Chino Hills murders and arrest 

On the morning of June 5, 1983, Bill Hughes arrived at a semi-rural home in Chino Hills, California, where his 11-year-old son Christopher had spent the night. Inside, he found Douglas and Peggy Ryen, their 10-year-old daughter Jessica and his own son dead. They had been chopped with a hatchet, sliced with a knife, and stabbed with an ice-pick. Josh Ryen, the 8-year-old son of Douglas and Peggy, had survived. His throat had been cut. Mrs. Ryen's purse was in plain sight on the kitchen counter, but no money had been taken. The family station wagon was gone; it was discovered several days later in Long Beach, California, about 50 miles southwest of Chino Hills.

The San Bernardino County Sheriff's Department deputies who responded to the call identified Kevin Cooper as the likely killer. He had admittedly hidden out in the vacant house next door, the Lease house, 125 yards away, for two days. He had made repeated calls from this house to two female friends asking for money to help with his escape, but they had refused. Cooper testified at trial that he had left that house as soon as it got dark on June 4 and had hitchhiked to Mexico. It was established that Cooper checked into a hotel in Tijuana, about 130 miles south of Chino Hills, at 4:30 pm on June 5.

There, Cooper befriended an American couple who owned a sailboat. He hitched a ride on the boat with them as a crew member cruising the Baja and Southern California coasts.

Seven weeks later, while still staying on the couple's boat, Cooper was accused of raping a woman at knife point on a boat docked nearby. While visiting the sheriff's office to report the crime, the rape victim saw a wanted poster with Cooper's photograph and identified him as the rapist. Deputies and coast guard personnel detained him as he tried to swim ashore. Cooper was never charged with rape or assault in this matter.

Evidence
There is disagreement about Cooper's guilt and the evidence supporting it.
The evidence used to convict Cooper includes the following.

 A khaki green button identical to the buttons on CIM jackets was found in the room where Cooper slept. The button had blood on it that could have come from either Cooper or the victims.
 A blood-stained rope was found in the closet of the bedroom used by Cooper. The rope was similar to another rope found in the Ryen driveway, but lacked a center cord.  
 Luminol testing seemed to indicate that there were bloody footprints in the hallway leading to the bedroom Cooper used and on the shower walls in the Lease house.
 Hair similar to that of Jessica Ryen was found in the bathroom sink in the Lease house.
 A hair removed from the bathroom shower in the Lease house was similar to Douglas Ryen's hair.
 A hatchet that went missing from the Lease house was very similar to the hatchet found on the side of the road by a citizen. The hatchet found on the road side contained blood and hairs that were consistent with that of Douglas and Josh Ryen. A sheath was found on the floor near the bedroom where Cooper slept
 Buck knives, an 11-inch hunting knife, and ice picks were missing from the Lease house. The strap for a buck knives was found on the floor in the bedroom Cooper slept in.
 Blood Stain A-41 was identified as belonging to Kevin Cooper, though there are questions regarding the handling of the evidence and whether it was tampered with prior to testing. 
 ProKed Tennis Shoe prints consistent with the size and pattern of the shoes given to Cooper at CIM were found in the Lease house and in several parts of the Ryen house.
 Plant burrs recovered from Jessica Ryen's nightgown were similar to those found on a blanket inside a closet in the Lease house and in the Ryen car. These burs were also similar to burrs from vegetation between the hideout house and the Ryen house.
 Role Rite tobacco, the type Cooper used, which is free to CIM inmates and not available at retail, was found in the Ryen's car and the bedroom Cooper stayed in.
 Cigarette butts with Cooper's saliva were found in the Ryen car. Post-conviction DNA testing confirmed that DNA from one of the butts would match one in 19 billion people while the other would match one in 110 million people.
 Hair consistent with Cooper's was found in the Ryen car.

Trial
On Cooper's motion, the court changed the venue of the trial from San Bernardino County to San Diego County. Cooper pleaded guilty to the charge of escape from prison.

In videotaped testimony, Josh Ryen said that the evening before the murders, just before the family left for the Blade barbecue, three Mexican men came to the Ryen home looking for work. Ryen did not identify the killer, but said in an audiotape with his treating psychiatrist that he saw the back of a single man attacking his mother. Ryen told a sheriff he thought three men had done it because "I thought it was them. And, you know, like they stopped up that night," but he did not actually see three people during the incident.

Cooper testified in his own defense. He admitted escaping from CIM, hiding out and sleeping at the Lease house, but denied committing the murders or being in the Ryen house. Cooper said he left the Lease house on foot, hitchhiked, stole a purse, and eventually made his way to Mexico. The defense pointed out the inconsistencies in Ryen's testimony, presented evidence of other events apparently not involving Cooper that might have had something to do with the killings, and presented an expert witness that criticized the forensic investigation.

A jury convicted Cooper of four counts of first degree murder and one count of attempted murder with the intentional infliction of great bodily injury, and then imposed the death penalty.

During the penalty phase of Cooper's trial, a stipulation was entered that “Kevin Cooper was the man who abducted (the female minor) on October 8th of 1982 from the Heath residence, kidnapped her, and later raped her in Frock Park." Cooper agreed to the stipulation on the advice of his lawyer who mistakenly believed this admission would help Cooper avoid the death penalty in this case.

Possible manipulation of evidence 

Cooper has continuously denied any involvement in the crimes for almost 30 years. Some arguments supporting his innocence include:
 Judge Fletcher writes that while a button found in the house came from a green prison jacket, "uncontradicted evidence at trial showed that Cooper was wearing a brown or tan prison-issued jacket when he escaped." Deputy Patrick Whelchel would later tell Cooper's defense that he had been asked to acquire a prison issue jacket and shoes from the prison within a day or two of the murders.
 Judge Fletcher suggested that since the chemical test used to detect blood also reacted to bleach, and since a previous occupant had admitted at trial to cleaning the shower and sink with bleach just prior to vacating, that the supposed blood in the shower and sink could have potentially been the bleach used by the tenant to clean up. Luminol testing also reacts to coppery substances, plant enzymes, microorganisms and excrement, raising an alternate explanation for the luminol results in the hallway and bedrooms.
 The witnesses who identified the hatchet as coming from the hideout house only did so after being spoken to by Mary Ann Hughes, the mother of Christopher Hughes. When the defense sought to question witnesses about this during the trial they were blocked from doing so. 
 The fingerprints of Officer Stephen Moran were recovered from the interior of the closet where Cooper had his sleeping nest, and were determined to have been left the day before the evidence in the closet was officially found. Moran himself would deny ever entering the closet. 
 Judge Fletcher suggested that preservatives found in the blood on the tan T-shirt indicated that it may have been planted (arguing that Huff ignored testing which showed that four of the alleged control samples either had DNA or were inconclusive and thus could not be legitimate controls, and that Huff had both failed to test the new sample to see if it was blood and ignored that the EDTA corresponded with the DNA). "If the EDTA testing already performed shows that Cooper's blood was planted on the t-shirt, or if further EDTA testing does the same thing, that showing greatly increases the likelihood that much of the evidence introduced at trial was false," Fletcher wrote. Some argue that Gregonis planted Cooper's blood in order to ensure a positive result. 
Prosecutors claimed during the trial that a bloody footprint found on the Ryens’ bedsheet and another print on a spa cover outside the Ryen home matched the size and type of the Pro-Ked ‘‘Dude’’ sneakers Cooper was issued inside the prison, further claiming that the shoe was distributed solely through prisons and other government institutions like the one Cooper had escaped only two days prior to the murders. Cooper’s attorneys, however, obtained statements from James Taylor, an inmate who said he issued Cooper PF Flyer shoes, and Midge Carroll, the former prison warden, who said the shoes the prison purchased for inmates were widely available to the public through major retail outlets such as Sears. This information was enough to temporarily put a halt to his execution for further examination. Don Luck, a Stride-Rite Executive, would also say that it was possible to acquire the shoes through the company catalog, again impeaching the state's claim that the shoes were unavailable through retail. The state would in turn argue that they had never argued that the shoes were unique.
 In the initial search of the Ryen's station wagon, no cigarette butts were found. Judge Fletcher writes, "Some of those cigarette butts could have easily been planted in the car. Moreover, after initial forensic testing, paper from a hand-rolled cigarette butt supposedly found in the station wagon was described as consumed. That same paper later "reappeared" and was offered into evidence. When the paper "reappeared," it was significantly larger than the paper in the cigarette butt that had been tested." 
 Multiple cigarettes recovered from Cooper's hideout were never entered into evidence. The same officers who processed the house (Craig Ogino and David Stockwell) would also be the ones to discover the cigarettes in the car, raising the possibility that they planted the cigarettes in the car.
 The tan t shirt with Cooper's blood on it was not prison issued, and none of the people in the lease house recognized it despite identifying other items of clothing that Cooper had stolen from the house.
The sole survivor, Josh Ryen, indicated with a communication board to a social worker and deputy in the emergency room that 3 or 4 white men committed the murders. Judge Fletcher wrote, "Deputies misrepresented his recollections and gradually shaped his testimony so that it was consistent with the prosecution's theory that there was only one killer."
 Records would show that a second, now missing, blue shirt had been recovered near the bar shortly before the tan shirt presented at trial. Judge Fletcher pointed out that the police's own procedures meant that the shirt would have only appeared in the records if it were found by a civilian (since the tan shirt was found by an officer the records could not have been referring to the shirt), which disproved the state's claim that there was only ever one shirt. The records also described the shirt as having what looked like blood on it, and one of the state's witnesses admitted that one of the three men had been wearing a blue shirt. In spite of this, Judge Huff accepted the state's claim and blocked the defense from pursuing the matter.
 Donald Gamundoy, a social worker who interviewed Josh prior to the police questioning, stated at trial that Josh had not only identified 3 attackers but specifically stated they were not Mexican or African American. This contradicts the state's claim that Josh confused there being multiple murderers with his memory of three Mexican men that were looking for landscaping work the day before the killing.
 Blond hairs were found clutched in Jessica Ryen's hand. Under oath, Dr Ed Blake conceded that most of the hairs had never been tested, and when Judge Huff did order retesting she limited the testing to hairs that were proven not to have Antigen roots (essentially guaranteeing a negative result).

An alternate suspect 

Over the years, the defense has raised the possibility that a man named Lee Furrow was the actual killer.

Arguments in favor of the alternate suspect theory

Judge William Fletcher, in a 2010 lecture at Gonzaga University, wrote that on June 9, Diana Roper called the Sheriff's Department to tell them that her boyfriend, Lee Furrow, had come home in the early hours of June 4. He changed out of his overalls which he left on the floor of a closet. He was not wearing a tan t-shirt that he had been wearing earlier in the day. He left after five minutes and did not return. [Roper and her father] both concluded that the overalls were spattered with blood. The Sheriff's Department never tested the overalls for blood, never turned them over to Cooper or his lawyers, and disposed of them on the day of Cooper's arraignment. 
 Phone Logs proved that a deputy sheriff made multiple attempts to give the coveralls to the lead investigator. This contradicted the deputy's claim that he never considered the coveralls of value and seemed to show that he had in fact believed Diana Roper's story. A supervisor admitted to an investigator that he signed off on disposing of the overalls, thereby impeaching deputy Eckley's testimony at trial that he made that decision on his own initiative.
Roper later provided an affidavit stating that a bloody tan t-shirt found beside a road leading from the murder house was Furrow's t-shirt. It was a Fruit-of-the-Loom t-shirt with a breast pocket. Roper stated that she recognized it because she had bought it for him. In addition, no one in the hideout house recognized the tan shirt despite positively identifying other items of clothing that Cooper had stolen.
 Roper also stated that a bloody hatchet found beside a road leading from the murder house matched Furrow's hatchet that was now missing from her garage.
A man named Clarence Ray Allen (executed by California in 2006) previously had a disagreement with the Ryens over a horse he purchased from them. Diana Roper's boyfriend, Lee Furrow, was an employee of Allen's security company. In 1977, Furrow pled guilty to murdering in 1974, on Allen's orders as part of a burglary coverup, Mary Sue Kitts, a 17-year-old girlfriend of Allen's son. Allen was also convicted of Kitts murder. At the time of the Ryen murders, Allen had been on death row since 1982 for orchestrating from prison for Billy Ray Hamilton (died in 2007 on death row of natural causes) to murder Furrow (and seven other witnesses) to prevent him from testifying in Allen's appeal of the Kitts murder conviction. At the 2010 Gonzaga University lecture, Judge Fletcher stated, "Furrow had been released from state prison a year earlier. He had been part of a murderous gang, but had been given a short sentence in return for turning state's evidence against the leader of the gang [Clarence Ray Allen]. The leader [Allen] was sentenced to death. Furrow told friends that while he was part of the gang he killed a girl [Mary Sue Kitts], cut up her body, and thrown her body parts into the Kern River."
 Judge Fletcher related in his 2010 Gonzaga lecture that in Diana Roper's June 9 call to the Sheriff's Department she told them that when Lee Furrow had come home in the early hours of June 4 he arrived in an unfamiliar station wagon with some people who stayed in the car. 
 A further investigation revealed that Lee Furrow's stepmother lived less than 5 miles from where the victim's station wagon was ultimately found.
 According to Cooper's attorneys at least three witnesses have come forward saying that Furrow confessed to the killings and that they would be willing to testify under oath if called upon.

Arguments against the alternate suspect theory

According to the Ninth Circuit, Roper's allegations “lack credibility.” Roper was abusing drugs and hallucinating the night she says she saw Furrow. She also had a motive to disparage Furrow because he left her on the night of the murders and began a sexual relationship with her childhood friend.

Furrow provided his DNA for testing. A law firm appointed by the governor of California to review the case concluded that no DNA evidence points to any person other than Kevin Cooper.

Post-trial DNA testing 
In 2001, Cooper became the first death row inmate in California to successfully request post-conviction DNA testing of evidence. The results of those DNA tests failed to exonerate him of the 1983 murders and indicated (1) Cooper's DNA was present both at the crime scene and in the stolen station wagon, (2) hairs found on three of the victims were likely their own, and (3) no DNA belonging to other assailants was present.

Blood testing 
DNA testing confirmed that Cooper's blood was at the crime scene. However, it was later found that a blood vial containing Cooper's blood possibly contained a second individual's blood; Judge Huff would block any attempt to pursue the matter during the hearings and the vial itself would later be found empty when the defense won the right to retest it in 2019. More importantly, prosecution expert Daniel Gregonis had checked Cooper's blood out for 24 hours without informing Cooper's attorneys (alongside his saliva and the bloodstain recovered from the house). This is significant because of two key pieces of evidence that relied on blood from Cooper: 
 
 Gregonis' initials were on a pillbox that contained A-41 recovered from the house, as well as the date he checked it out. According to lab practice it is common to mark the seal when it is opened. This has caused some to speculate that Gregonis was untruthful when he later claimed that he never opened the vial.
 A bloodstain located on a T-shirt that was found beside a road some distance from the Ryen home; the shirt has several blood stains.
 Doug Ryen was the donor of a bloodstain. 
 Cooper was the donor of blood on the t-shirt, in particular, two blood smears and possibly of blood spatter. 
 Cooper's DNA was not on the hatchet, one of the murder weapons. The hatchet had blood from victims Jessica Ryen, Doug Ryen, and Chris Hughes (Peggy Ryen and Josh Ryen cannot be excluded as minor contributors). This has caused some people to argue that Daniel Gregonis planted Cooper's blood on the evidence in order to ensure a positive result.

EDTA testing 

After the blood test results came back supporting Cooper's guilt he claimed that the blood had been planted and asked that the T-shirt be tested for presence of EDTA, a preservative. 
High levels of EDTA would show that the blood came from a vial rather than directly from Cooper. The EDTA testing was conducted by Cooper's chosen expert Dr. Ballard but failed to show elevated levels of EDTA.
While Judge Huff would claim that the blood stain had levels of EDTA lower than most controls on the T-shirt and “dramatically lower than the level of EDTA expected in a tampering scenario involving blood from a purple-topped tube", Judge William Fletcher pointed to DNA testing done by the state's expert Terry Lee as proof that the controls actually had DNA in them, and were thus not legitimate controls at all. He also uses a graph to argue that the EDTA corresponded with the DNA in each of the stains.
Additional testing by Dr. Gary Suizdak on ten specimens found significant levels of EDTA. However, according to both Suizdak and the state's expert Dr. Terry Lee, the samples were most likely contaminated by EDTA present in Suizdak's lab. This claim has been disputed, and when Cooper's attorneys asked to see Dr. Siuzdak's notes to verify the claim they were denied access by Judge Huff.

Hair testing 

According to Dr. Terry Melton, the hairs obtained from Jessica Ryen's hand were either animal hairs or human hairs that came from herself or someone maternally related to her. Other hairs selected by Cooper's expert Dr. Peter DeForest came from domestic dogs. Nevertheless, Judge Huff had also limited testing to hair without Antigen roots, essentially guaranteeing a negative result.

Cigarette testing 

When Cooper's hideout was searched multiple cigarettes were not processed into evidence. Officers Craig Ogino and David Stockwell (the officers who processed the hideout) were also the officers who discovered the cigarettes in the car. The Cigarettes were also listed as consumed prior to the trial. According to Dr Ed Blake's notes the Cigarettes were 4 mm long and yellow in color. In 2001, the cigarettes were white and had grown to 7 mm. Notably, when Daniel Gregonis checked out A-41 he also checked out Cooper's saliva as well as a known blood sample.

Assessment by courts, governors and independent groups

California Supreme Court 
The Supreme Court of California upheld Cooper's conviction in May 1991.

Cooper was scheduled to be executed on February 10, 2004 but on February 8, 2004 a three judge panel consisting of Judges Pamela Rymer, Ronald Gould and James Browning heard Cooper's petition and rejected it by a vote of 2–1.

Judge Browning, the lone dissenter, was able to assemble enough judges to get an en banc ruling blocking the execution to allow further DNA testing. Ultimately, the US Supreme Court unanimously upheld the stay, effectively making it impossible to carry out the death warrant.

The postponement followed a campaign by various groups in the Bay Area and around the country, such as the Campaign to End the Death Penalty, the ACLU, Death Penalty Focus and The Mobilization to Free Mumia Abu-Jamal.

Denial of clemency by California Governor Schwarzenegger 
On January 30, 2004, the office of Governor of California Arnold Schwarzenegger issued the following statement regarding his decision not to grant clemency to Kevin Cooper:

On December 17, 2010, Cooper filed a second clemency petition to Governor Schwarzenegger. This petition laid out new developments in the evidence that were not known when the first one was denied in 2004. The second clemency petition also cited the conclusions and observations of twelve appellate judges of the Ninth Circuit Court of Appeals, including the fact that blood taken from Cooper after he was arrested was contaminated with the DNA of another person, that a sheriff's deputy had lied at Cooper's trial about destruction of key evidence, and that three witnesses, never interviewed by the prosecution, had come forward with strong evidence of other possible perpetrators.
 
Just before Governor Schwarzenegger left office in January 2011, his office wrote a letter to Cooper's lawyer stating that the application "raises many evidentiary concerns which deserve a thorough and careful review of voluminous records." The letter further stated that since the Governor had only two weeks left in office, he had decided to leave the matter for Governor-elect Jerry Brown's determination.

U.S. Ninth Circuit Court and U.S Supreme Court deny appeals 
Cooper has filed multiple appeals and applications for a writ of habeas corpus, all of which have been denied. On December 4, 2007, the Ninth Circuit Court of Appeals denied Cooper's third federal petition for a writ of habeas corpus. The panel concluded: "As the district court, and all state courts, have repeatedly found, evidence of Cooper's guilt was overwhelming. The tests that he asked for to show his innocence 'once and for all' show nothing of the sort."

On May 11, 2009, the Ninth Circuit denied Cooper's request for a rehearing en banc of the 2007 panel decision. Four judges (Fletcher, Wardlaw, Fisher, and Reinhardt) filed dissents, indicating that they disagreed with the decision. Judge Fletcher stated that there was a strong likelihood that the police tampered with the evidence and accused Judge Huff of deliberately ignoring the Court's instructions to perform proper testing, while Judge Wardlaw stated "as far as due process is concerned 25 years of flawed proceedings are as good as no proceedings at all." Eleven judges joined the dissents (fourteen votes were required to grant the request for a rehearing), though Judge Stephen Reinhardt hinted that the gap may have been closer. Judge Rymer, who authored the original panel decision, filed a concurrence defending both the original decision and the decision to deny an en banc hearing.

Cooper's petition for certiorari to the United States Supreme Court was denied on November 30, 2009.

Inter-American Commission on Human Rights recommends a review 

In April 2011 Cooper filed a petition with the Inter-American Commission on Human Rights(IACHR) alleging that his human rights had been violated in multiple respects by his prosecution, conviction and death sentence. The IACHR concluded that the United States had violated Articles I, II, XVIII and XXVI of the American Declaration of the Rights and Duties of Man. The Commission found eight instances where Cooper's due process rights had been violated, that Cooper had received ineffective assistance of trial counsel, and that there were serious questions about racial discrimination in Cooper's prosecution. The IACHR recommended that Cooper be granted "effective relief, including the review of his trial and sentence."

American Bar Association recommendation for clemency 

On Saturday, March 19, 2016, the president of the American Bar Association (ABA), Paulette Brown, submitted a letter to Governor of California Jerry Brown, suggesting that Cooper be granted clemency due to claims of racial bias, police misconduct, evidence tampering and poor-quality defense counsel. "We recommend that this investigation include testing of forensic evidence still available to be analyzed to put to rest the questions that continue to plague his death sentence. This is the only course of action that can ensure that Mr. Cooper receives due process and the protection of his rights under the Constitution," Ms. Brown wrote.

New DNA testing order by California Governor Brown 

In May 2018, Nicholas Kristof wrote an article in The New York Times highlighting the case, arguing that the truth could be determined by doing advanced testing on the bloodstained t-shirt, the hatchet handle and the hand towel used by the murderer and including diagrams showing both that Lee Furrow's stepmother lived close to where the victim's car was recovered and that Officer Steven Moran most likely planted evidence to frame Cooper. Soon afterward, Kamala Harris (who was at first against the test) and Dianne Feinstein both publicly called for advanced DNA testing. In response, DA Michael Ramos submitted a response to Cooper's petition, calling for the petition to be refused. Ramos would also file to have Cooper executed following his failed attempt to be re-elected.

On July 3, California Governor Jerry Brown hinted that he might be willing to approve DNA testing, sending Cooper's attorneys a list of questions. On August 17, the defense submitted their response, revealing that they had managed to acquire Lee Furrow's DNA for testing. On October 6, Nick Kristof wrote a follow-up in which he reported that Lee Furrow had told him that he was now open for testing to "clear his name."

In December 2018, outgoing Gov. Brown ordered new DNA testing in the Cooper case. The testing has since been revealed; insufficient DNA was recovered from the shirt but a profile that was neither Cooper or Furrow was recovered from a hand towel taken from the victim's house. No blood from the victims was found on the towel, and it was only assumed to have been used by the killer to wipe his hands. Vial VV-2 was also found drained of blood, which was described as "unusual" by DNA expert Bicka Barlow, while A-41 was found to have an unknown profile that didn't match Cooper or the victims (prosecutors would later claim that this profile didn't exist.)

Independent investigation order by California Governor Newsom 

On May 28, 2021 governor Gavin Newsom signed an executive order appointing the law firm Morrison & Foerster to "launch an independent investigation of death row inmate Kevin Cooper’s case as part of the evaluation of Cooper’s application for clemency. The investigation will review trial and appellate records in the case, the facts underlying the conviction and all available evidence, including the results of the recently conducted DNA tests previously ordered by the Governor to examine additional evidence in the case using the latest, most scientifically reliable forensic testing." The investigation would ultimately reject Cooper's claim, but acknowledged that it had not fully evaluated claims of prosecutorial and law enforcement misconduct "except in instances in which they determined that they were relevant to Cooper's claim of innocence." The investigation also acknowledged that it had not evaluated claims that Cooper's trial and the verdict had been influenced by racial prejudice. Cooper's attorneys responded the following day, arguing that the investigation was "demonstrably incomplete" and that the investigators had "failed to follow the basic steps taken by all innocence investigations that have led to so many exonerations of the wrongfully convicted."

See also 

 Capital punishment in California
 List of death row inmates in the United States

References

External links
 "Cooper Watch," article series by the Inland Valley Daily Bulletin
 Free Kevin Cooper: An Innocent Man on Death Row

Family murders
1958 births
Living people
1983 murders in the United States
American people convicted of murder
American mass murderers
American prisoners sentenced to death
Prisoners sentenced to death by California
Place of birth missing (living people)
People convicted of murder by California
American murderers of children
American anti–death penalty activists
African-American people
20th-century American criminals
Criminals from Pennsylvania
American rapists
People from Pittsburgh
20th-century African-American people